Ust-Ilga is a rural locality in Zhigalovsky District of Irkutsk Oblast, Russia. Population:

Geography
It lies on the left bank of the Ilga river near its confluence with the Lena.

See also
Lena-Angara Plateau

References

External links
  Zhigalovsky District - General Information (in Russian)

Rural localities in Irkutsk Oblast
Zhigalovsky District